Mauro Mellano (1944– 21 September 2007) was an Italian economist and professor at the University of Rome La Sapienza.

Bibliography 
 Mellano, M. and Zupi, M. (2007) Economia e politica della cooperazione allo sviluppo Editori Laterza.
 Mellano, M. (2004) Riconsiderando alcune teorie dello sviluppo economico (Roma 2004)
 Mellano, M. and Schenkel, M. (eds) (2004) Le imprese del terzo tipo : economia e etica delle organizzazioni non profit .
 Mellano, M.(eds.) (2002) 'Integrazione economica e Cooperazione allo sviluppo nel bacino del Mediterraneo', La Sapienza Editrice.
 Mellano, M., Costantini, V., Capriolo, A. (2002) Crescita economica, Commercio internazionale e inquinamento globale Sinergie, 20(59), 2002, pp. 43–60
 Mellano, M., (2000) "Gli aspetti strutturali e le prospettive di internazionalizzazione nell'industria agro alimentare", L'Industria, 21(1), 2000, pp. 27–53.
 Mellano, M.,(1999) "Acquacoltura e dinamiche di mercato", Annali del dipartimento di studi geoeconomici, statistici, storici per l'analisi regionale atistici, storici per l'analisi regionale, 5, 1999, pp. 359–368.
 Mellano, M, Pesce, A. (1996) "Commercio Sud-Sud e integrazione economica.", Politica internazionale, 24(5), 1996, pp. 253–271.
 Mellano, M. and Javier Diez de Medina Romero (1995) "L'aiuto alimentare in alcuni paesi dell'America Latina e dell'Africa sub-sahariana" in Gervasio Antonelli, Elisabetta Basile "L'aiuto pubblico allo sviluppo. L'esperienza della comunità europea"
 Lorusso and Mellano, M. (1993)La struttura dell'industria alimentare nelle principali aree ad economia di mercato Edizioni Scientifiche Italiane
 Antonelli,G. Bagarani, M. Mellano, M. (1989) Modelli di spesa e politica agraria regionale. Un'analisi della spesa pubblica delle regioni a statuto ordinario.
 Antonelli,G. M.Bagarani,M. Mellano,M (1989), Modelli di spesa e politica agra- ria regionale. Un'analisi della spesa pubblica delle regioni a statuto ordinario, Facoltà di Economia e Commercio di Urbino, F.Angeli, Milano.
 Antonelli,G. M.Bagarani,M. Mellano,M (1988), La spesa pubblica per l'agricoltura delle regioni a statuto ordinario, Ministero del Tesoro, Roma. 
 Antonelli,G. M.Bagarani,M. Mellano,M (1987), Spesa pubblica per l'agricoltura delle regioni a statuto ordinario (Problemi e prospettive della politica agraria livello regionale), Università di Urbino - CESIT.
 Bagarani, M, Magni, C. Mellano, M. (1986) "Specializzazione produttiva e differenziazioni regionali nell'agricoltura italiana: un metodo di valutazione", Rivista di economia agraria, (4), 1986, pp. 423.
 Antonelli, G. and Mellano,M. (1984)"Strumenti e obiettivi di politica agraria nell'analisi della spesa pubblica regionale", QA La Questione agraria, (15), 1984, pp. 77.
 Antonelli, G. and Mellano,M. (1982) "La valutazione degli effetti delle politiche regionali: una rassegna di alcuni modelli", Rivista di economia agraria, (1), 1982, pp. 227.
 Antonelli G., Mellano M. (1981), La politica agraria delle regioni attraverso un’analisi di spesa pubblica, QA -La Questione Agraria, n. 3.
 Antonelli, G. and Mellano,M. (1980)"La spesa per l'agricoltura delle regioni a statuto ordinario. Un bilancio di politica agraria", Rivista di economia agraria, (3), 1980, pp. 597.

References

Monni,S., Spaventa, A. (2009) “Al largo di Okinawa – Petrolio, armi e affari nella sfida tra Cina e USA” [in Italian],- Editori Laterza.  pp. 4
S.Santi, F. Tiburtini, P. Crivellaro, S. Milio (2005) ; Impresse e allargamento UE - Come investire e operare con successo nei paesi comunitari AGRA edizione, 2005
S.Santi (2011), Abdul Jeelani ritorno a Colori, Il Molo ed. 
F.Russo, S. Santi, Non Ho più Paura, Gremese ed.

Students
 Massimo Bagarani, Professor
Linda Meleo, Municipal councilor of Rome 
 Simone Santi, President Leonardo Group, President Eurocam Mocambique, President CCMI (Italian Mozmbican Chamber of Commerce), President Energy O&G and Mineral Resources CTA (Mozambican Business Association) Honorary Consul of Mozambique (Milan) Italian Delegate CE- CPLP CE- Palop (Portuguese speaking African and int countries)
 Alessandro Spaventa, Managing director Internazionale
 Giosuè Pesare

External links 
 Mellano boys and girls
 MaMe Foundation - Mauro Mellano maestro ed amico-

Italian economists
2007 deaths
1944 births